Volodymyr Arenev (is a pen name of Ukrainian science fiction, fantasy award-winning writer, journalist and screenwriter Volodymyr Puziy. Writes in Russian and Ukrainian languages, resides in Kyiv, Ukraine.

Biography

Volodymyr Kostiantynovych Puziy was born October 1, 1978 in Kyiv. In school he was very fond of biology, attended young naturalists group at Kyiv Zoo, admired Gerald Durrell and James Herriot, and seriously engaged in keeping exotic amphibians and insects in vivarium at home. In 1995 applied to Biological faculty, but failed. For the next year Arenev worked as a sweeper at Kyiv Zoo. In 1996 he successfully applied to Institute of Journalism of Taras Shevchenko National University of Kyiv. After receiving Master’s Degree with distinction he started teaching the history of literature and numerous students’ courses on writing skills.

Science fiction and fantasy writer

For the time being Arenev has 21 books published in Ukrainian and Russian. His numerous short stories and novellas have been published in Ukrainian, Russian, Polish, Lithuanian, Estonian, French and English (more than 150 publications in periodicals and anthologies),. Debuted in fiction in 1998 with science fiction short story "Guardian Angel" published in the first issue "Maidan XXI" anthology.

First usage of pen-name Vladimir Arenev dates 2000, when he started a series of typical mainstream post-Tolkien fantasy. This period ended at 2005 and after a pause Arenev changed the format, working on fiction with a social narrative since 2008.
Arenev’s short stories and novellas were published at such anthologies as "Best of the year" and "New Legends" at Azbuka Publishing House, "SF&Fantasy" at AST, "Fantasy" at Eksmo, and in several magazines in Ukraine, Russia, Lithuania, Germany and Poland.

Journalist, editor, translator

Under his name Volodymyr Puziy is known as awarded literary critic and book reviewer, lecturer at SF&Fantasy conventions on Literary criticism issues. Also works as a freelance journalist for newspapers and magazines in Kyiv, Moscow and Saint-Petersburg.
 1999–2003 — an executive editor of students anthology ‘Sviatiy Volodymyr’.
 2003–2006 — regular author at "Realnost’ Fantastiki" magazine, Moscow.
 2004–present — author at "Mir Fantastiki" magazine, Moscow, columnist at "Modern intellectual prose" section since 2010.
 2005–2008 — supervisor of screenplay department of "Ragnesis-online" MMORPG project ("Intelligent Soft") developing the game world and coordinating screenwriters. The matherial was also used for the novel "An Affair of Honour".
 2011–present — biographical and historical articles at "Lichnosti" magazine, Kyiv.
Arenev also participated in editorial process of numerous fiction anthologies. Currently supervises and edits the "Dark fantasy" series of ‘Ripol-classic’ Publishing House, Moscow.
He wrote forewords and afterwords to the books of the well-known fantasy writers Maryna and Serhiy Dyachenko, H. L. Oldie, Jacek Piekara, Dmytro Skiriuk.
Translated Glen Cook’s "Tides Elba" short story and Andrzej Sapkowski’s "Spanienkreuz" into Russian (2011). Translation editor of Jacek Dukaj’s short novel "Serce Mroku", Jakub Nowak’s short novel and Jacek Piekara’s novels about Mordimer Madderdin published in Russia.

Literary Awards

Volodymyr Arenev was awarded with various literary awards in the science fiction and fantasy in the Commonwealth of Independent States and Europe.  Featured awards are:
 EuroCon (ESFS Awards) 2004 — Encouragement Award.
 Twice nominated (shortlisted) for Debut award (for the short stories series "We, humanses" In 2003 and for the novel "All Adam’s Race" in 2011.
 In 2011 have been at long list for the novel "Rings on the Ground".
 International Ukrainian-German O. Gonchar Award for novel "Rules of the Game" (2001).
 International convent of fiction writers Star Bridge (received the award 2001, 2005 and have been nominated a number of times).
 Alexander Belayev prize (2008).
 "Interpresscon" Award in 2006 from the Literary criticism nomination. Also was nominated for the short novel "It Runs in his Blood" in 2011, for the novel "Magus" in 2007, for the short novel "Speechless Teacher" in 2003.
 Nominated for The Marble Fawn award for two articles (2004) and short novel "The White Dame" (2010).
 "Die Kleine Nordklinge" for the best short story published in Germany in Russian (2003, 2011).
 Nominated for "Activation of the Word" Award for the novel "All Adam’s Race" in 2011.
 "FantLab's Book of the Year Award, 2012", award for best on-line publication for short novel "Souluary" (Ukrainian "Душниця").
 Nominated for FantLab's Book of the Year Award for novel "Master of the Road" in 2013.
 "New Horizons 2014" award for Ukrainian Edition of a short novel "Souluary".
 "Best creator of children’s ScienceFiction or fantasy books", Spirit of Dedication EuroCon (ESFS Awards) 2014 in Dublin, Ireland, for Ukrainian Edition of a short novel "Souluary". Alexander Prodan also has been awarded for artwork for the book.

List of Publications

Novels
 2000 — Dragons' Despair
 2000 — Hunt for a Hero
 2000 — Rules of the Game
 2001 — The Return of the Creator
 2001 — The Cursed Treasure The book is sometimes considered to be a novella.
 2005 — The Juggler's Pilgrimage. The beginning of The Master of Heavenly Manor series. A working title of the second novel is "The Fate of the Juggler".
 2006 — Rigs on the Ground
 2006 — Magus
 2008 — An Affair of Honor The first novel from "Palimpsest" series (trilogy). A working title of the second novel is Rust on the Blade. Published in 2014 as Сommandant of the Dead Fortress.
 2011 — All Adam’s Race
 2013 — The Cursed Treasure. New edition with artwork. 
 2014 — Commandant of the Dead Fortress

Novellas (Short novels)
 2000 — "The Bookeater" Joint authorship with Yuri Nikitinskiy For children.
 2001 — "Speechless Teacher"
 2004 — "The City of Thousand Doors" For children.
 2004 — "Uncle Sam's Cabin"
 2005 — "Under Blue Skies"
 2006 — "Wind Never Lies"
 2010 — "The White Dame"
 2011 — "It Runs in his Blood"
 2014 —  "Souluary"  The title refers to words soul and ossuary. The novella describes the world where souls of dead people are still communicating with the relatives; those souls are put in balloon-shaped devices and kept in a special sacred place called souluary. The book won two ESFS Awards 2014.

Collections of short stories
 2003 — "Devil's Soul"
 2003 — "Lucky Coin"
 2004 — "The City of Thousand Doors" For children.
 2005 — "Wild Lords"
 2006 — "Speechless Teacher"
 2009 — "Picture Me the Heaven".
 2013 — "Roads Master"

References

External links
  Selected authors novellas and short stories www.rusf.ru (open access)
  Bibliography at Fantlab.ru
  Interview after Activation of the Word with biographical details
  Arenev’s page at Debut Award website

Ukrainian speculative fiction critics
Ukrainian science fiction writers
Ukrainian fantasy writers
Russian-language writers
Living people
Writers from Kyiv
1978 births